Yass
is a town in the Southern Tablelands of New South Wales, Australia in Yass Valley Council. The name appears to have been derived from an Aboriginal word, "Yarrh" (or "Yharr"), said to mean 'running water'.

Yass is located 280 km south-west of Sydney, on the Hume Highway. The Yass River, which is a tributary of the Murrumbidgee River, flows through the town. Yass is 59 km from Canberra; lying at an elevation of 505 m AMSL.

Yass has a historic main street, with well-preserved 19th-century verandah post pubs (mostly converted to other uses). It is popular with tourists, some from Canberra and others taking a break from the Hume Highway.

History

Aboriginal overview 
The area around Yass was occupied by Wiradjuri and Ngunnawal tribes. They knew the area as yarrh, which means "running water."

Colonial overview 
The Yass area was first seen by Europeans in 1821, during an expedition led by Hamilton Hume. By 1830, settlement had begun where the nascent Sydney to Melbourne road crossed the Yass River. The site for the town was gazetted in 1837. Yass was incorporated as a District Council in 1843, and boasted a population of 274 by 1848. On 13 March 1873, the Municipal District of Yass was created, and James Cottrell was subsequently elected as the first Mayor of Yass.

One of Australia's best-known poets, A.B. 'Banjo' Paterson arrived in the district in 1871, aged seven, passed his childhood there, and later bought a property in the Wee Jasper area so that his children could experience country life. Poet and priest Patrick Hartigan (pen name: John O'Brien) was born near Yass in 1878, and studied at the local convent school as a youth.

Sir Walter Merriman established 'Merryville', one of the country's most famous sheep studs, and arguably its leading fine-wool establishment, in 1903. Yass is a prominent area for raising sheep which produces very fine wool due to the soil and climatic conditions.

Yass was one of the sites proposed for the Federal Capital after 1901. The site of the new capital city would have been slightly west of the township of Yass, which would have been included in the surrounding federal territory.

In 1956, Yass became the first town in New South Wales to have a fluoridated water supply. The Hume Highway passed through the town until a bypass opened in July 1994.

Flour milling 
It has never been explained why Yass was the home to a number of flour mills, especially as the district is well known for the production of fine merino fleece. Linge notes that many "flour mills" were set up for the personal convenience of settlers rather than commercial operations (Linge 1979:108) and it may be that the mills were set up to grind locally produced grain for largely domestic consumption.

Bayley in his history of Yass records that, in March 1842, it was reported that the Yass Steam Mill was in operation (1973:24). This mill was located by the Yass River and was owned by the partnership of Hamilton Hume and John Watson. The mill was known as Watson's Mill. This mill seems to have operated until it was destroyed in a flood in 1870. At that time it was owned by Thomas Andrew Barber (Ames et al. 2001:9).

Barber was the son of the George Barber (who, with Hume, first explored Yass) and was also Hume's nephew. These connections no doubt lead to the choice of the site of Barber's next mill as the land was originally owned by Hume. Barber constructed a new steam mill and, by May 1870, steam was raised and the mill itself opened in June 1870 (Bayley 1973:46). According to Armes et al., the Barber family "occupied surviving housing on the corner of Comur and Adele Street" (2003:9). This mill, it is argued, is the existing brick structure known as "Crago's Flour Mill". The mill was operated by Barber until 1876 when he handed over his business interests to his sons Earnest and John, who traded under the name Barber Brothers.

Meanwhile, another steam mill – the Union Steam Mill – had been established and, by 1881, was owned by Petherick Tamblyn Crago. In around 1881 Crago purchased a site for a new mill between the White Horse Inn and Barber's Mill. The mill was called the Commercial Mill and from newspaper reports was operating from 1882. According to Ralph Crago (letter 1970) the decision to erect the new mill was because the machinery in the old Mill (presumably the Union Steam Mill) was worn out.

The Barbers declared bankruptcy in October 1889, and in December 1889 there was a meeting in Yass to discuss the mill. The meeting was told that the machinery was 50 years old, the foundations of the mill were 4 feet deep and that a new mill would take 12 months to construct while the existing mill could be made operational in the New Year. The mill recommenced trading in January 1891.

A notable event occurred in 1892 when Yass was finally connected to the New South Wales Government Railways' Main Southern railway line. However, by the time the tramway reached the mills Barber's Mill was only operating intermittently. It is not clear from newspaper reports but it seems Barber tried to sell the mill in 1895 but was unsuccessful and eventually the mill was purchased from an Ann Ross by Arthur Bryant Triggs, a prominent local businessman, in September 1897. Triggs began rebuilding the old Barber's mill, presumably as a roller mill. He also arranged for a siding to be constructed from Yass Station across Lead Street to the mill. Triggs opened the "new" mill in March 1898, but later that year in August sold the mill to Crago. This is the mill now standing in Yass.

According to information from Ralph Crago (letters written in 1955 and 1970) "Around – once more it is only a guess - the turn of the century or early in the new one – the stones [in the Commercial Mill] were replaced by steel rollers by a firm called Henry Simon & Co & the steam power was replaced by suction gas made from charcoal. We bought a lot of our charcoal from the Jerrawa area when small farmers added to their income & trucked it by rail to Yass." and "The Crago Brothers were very proud of winning a bronze medal at the Wembly Exhibition in the early 1900s for flour made at Yass".

In the aerial photograph of the site of the two mills taken in 1927 the chimneys of both mills have been removed suggesting that their steam engines were non-operational from at least that time. However, the Commercial Mill continued working until 1953. Ralph Crago, who was manager from 1947 onwards, noted that the Mill bought wheat locally but also from the surrounding district and harder wheat from the Gunnedah district was imported to blend with the softer "southern" wheat. All this wheat was bagged wheat but in 1953 the Wheat Board decided to cease the use of bagged wheat. Faced with the cost of erecting bulk handling facilities, the Crago family sold the Commercial Mill to the stock and station agents Winchombe Carson.

Winchombe Carson demolished the Commercial Mill in 1953 and erected a number of buildings on the site which were in turn demolished in July 2009, during which time remains of the Commercial Mill were excavated by an archaeological team.

A freezing works were established by Winchombe Carson at the site of Barber's Mill and numerous galvanised iron buildings were erected mainly to store bagged wheat for the Commercial Mill. After the Commercial Mill was demolished the Crago Mill (as Barber's Mill is now known) was used for storage and remains the only surviving above-ground remains of the four Flour Mills in Yass.

Both the standing mill building - Crago Mill and the archaeological remains of the Commercial Mill - were listed on the Register of the National Trust of Australia (NSW) in March 2014.

Railways 

Yass was a battleground between the town and the Sydney to Melbourne railway; because of the topography, the New South Wales Government Railways wanted to bypass the town by a few kilometres. Naturally, the people of the town wished the railway to pass closer or through it. In 1892 a light railway or tram was built to connect Yass Junction on the main line and Yass Town. The railway bridge across the Yass River was the first lightweight, steel Pratt-truss bridge in the NSW railway network.

The last trains operated on the line on 29 October 1988 when steam locomotives 1210 and 3112 operated three final journeys on the line.

The Yass Railway Heritage Centre uses the Yass Town station precinct as a museum. Yass had the nearest railway station on the Sydney Melbourne railway to serve the national capital at Canberra.

When the uniform gauge railway between Sydney and Melbourne opened in 1961, the parliamentarian deserving most of the credit - William Charles Wentworth - was unable to leave parliament since his vote was needed in an almost hung parliament. Instead of catching the inaugural train at Sydney, he had to catch it at Yass Junction, where it made a special stop.

Heritage

Heritage listings 
Yass has a number of heritage-listed sites, including:
 101 Comur Street: Yass Post Office
 Main Southern railway: Yass Junction railway station
 Yass Town Tramway: Yass Town rail bridge over Yass River
 Yass Town Tramway: Yass Town railway station
 Yass Valley Way, Marchmont: Cooma Cottage

Cooma Cottage 
Cooma Cottage is one of the oldest surviving rural houses in New South Wales. It has historic significance as a relatively intact complex of rural buildings and links to explorer and grazier Hamilton Hume. It is listed on the NSW Heritage register and is managed by the National Trust (NSW).

St Augustine's Catholic Church 
St Augustine's Parish Yass began in 1838 with the laying of the foundation stone of the church now called the chapel.

A striking modernist new building (the 'big' church) was begun in 1954 under the eye of the then Bishop Young, later Archbishop of Hobart. The architect for the church was architects Fowell Mansfield and Maclurcan of Sydney. The builder was James Wallace of 123 Sussex Street, Sydney.

There are important works of art by renowned Australian sculptor Tom Bass in the Church:
 the crucifix on the outside
 the crucifix on the rear doors
 the statue of St Paul and
 the recently installed low-relief of St Augustine near the front door.

The foundation stone of the new church was laid on 11 April 1954 by Archbishop Eris O'Brien and the church was opened on 29 April 1956, by Archbishop Guilford Young.

Fifty-year celebrations were organised on 29 April 2006 by Father Laurie Bent, who was Parish Priest in Yass at the time.

Yass & District Museum 
The Yass & District Museum represents Yass from the 1820s. Exhibitions pay tribute to the life and work of explorer and grazier Hamilton Hume, Yass soldiers and nurses who served in 20th-century wars, the Inns of Yass, Burrinjuck Dam; and illustrate a 19th-century shop, parlour and kitchen, rural life and work in a woolshed.

Climate 
The climate in Yass is intermediate between the South Eastern Highlands and South West Slopes bioregions, having characteristics of both zones. Compared to Goulburn, it has a wider seasonal range and notably wetter winters relative to other seasons, though not quite to the extent as those of Gundagai. Yass has a relatively dry climate owing to its rainshadow from the southwest, however is exposed to the west-northwest, unlike Goulburn which is sheltered entirely from westerlies. Snow falls occasionally but is usually light and rarely settles, though heavy snowfalls do occur on the hills to the southwest (around Wee Jasper).

Institutions

Yass High School 
Established in 1958

Yass Valley Council

Yass Tribune

Notable residents 
 Jack Beaton, rugby league player.
 Horse race trainer Lee Freedman and his brothers Anthony, Michael and Richard grew up in Yass.
 Alice Giles, harpist.
 Media tycoon Rupert Murdoch owns "Cavan", a large property just south of Yass.
 Craig Wilkinson, guitarist of the rock band RedHook, attended and graduated from Yass High School.

Local events 
The Yass Show is held in March, the Turning Wave Festival from 2012 to 2017 in September, and the Yass Arts-and-Crafts Festival in November, along with numerous other festivals and events throughout the year.

In 2021 the Yass Show is scheduled for 20 March. Usually a two-day event, it was reduced to one day to allow volunteers to handle the restrictions imposed due to the COVID-19 pandemic in Australia. It will start earlier, and finish later.

In popular culture 
In 2018, the town was featured in Queer Eye, a Netflix original series. The town was chosen as its name matches one of the cast's favourite sayings: yaass.

Yass is also famous for a humorous billboard for the town's McDonald's restaurant, shows the McDonald's logo and the town's name (making it read "M YASS", similar to "my ass").

References

Citations

Sources 

 
 A brochure produced by Yass Tourist Information Centre, Printed June, 2000.

External links 

 Whitehurst Yass Photographic Collection by R. Whitehurst (1870?–1989) held in Pictures Collection, National Library of Australia, Canberra
 Google Earth - Yass

 
Towns in New South Wales
Southern Tablelands
Yass Valley Council
Hume Highway
Proposed sites for national capital of Australia